The 2016 Taça da Liga Final was the final match of the 2015–16 Taça da Liga, the ninth season of the Taça da Liga.

Trophy holders Benfica beat Marítimo 6–2 (for the second consecutive final) to win a third consecutive and record seventh title in the competition, in a total of nine editions.

Route to the final

Note: In all results below, the score of the finalist is given first (H: home; A: away).

Match

Details

Statistics

References

2016
Taca da Liga
C.S. Marítimo matches
S.L. Benfica matches